This is a list of Members of Parliament (MPs) elected in the October 1974 general election, held on 10 October. This Parliament was dissolved in 1979.

Composition
These representative diagrams show the composition of the parties in the October 1974 general election.

Note: The Scottish National Party and Plaid Cymru sit together as a party group. This is not the official seating plan of the House of Commons, which has five rows of benches on each side, with the government party to the right of the Speaker and opposition parties to the left, but with room for only around two-thirds of MPs to sit at any one time.

This is a list of Members of Parliament elected to the Parliament of the United Kingdom in October 1974 general election, held on 10 October.  This was the second general election to be held that year. The Parliament lasted until 1979.

Notable newcomers to the House of Commons included Margaret Jackson (later Margaret Beckett), David Penhaligon, Bryan Gould, Margaret Bain (later Margaret Ewing), Helene Hayman and Ann Taylor.



By-elections
See the list of United Kingdom by-elections.

Four seats were vacant when Parliament was dissolved preparatory to the 1979 general election:
Abingdon – Airey Neave (Con)
Batley and Morley – Alfred Broughton (Lab)
Chipping Barnet – Reginald Maudling (Con)
North East Derbyshire – Tom Swain (Lab)

In addition, Maurice Orbach (Labour MP for Stockport South) died on 24 April, after dissolution but before the general election.

Defections
 14 April 1976: John Stonehouse (Walsall North) defects from Labour to English National Party
 26 July 1976: James Sillars (Ayrshire South) and John Robertson (Paisley) resign from Labour Party and sit as Scottish Labour
1977–1978: The Vanguard Progressive Unionist Party fell apart. William Craig (East Belfast) and Robert Bradford (South Belfast) joined the Ulster Unionist Party. John Dunlop joined the United Ulster Unionist Party.
1977: James Kilfedder (North Down) left the Ulster Unionist Party and sat as an independent unionist.

Progression of government majority and party totals 
The government voting total is the total number of Labour MPs, minus the Labour Deputy Speakers (two until 3 Feb 1976, one from that date). The opposition voting total is the total number of other MPs, minus the Speaker and the Conservative Deputy Speakers (one until 3 Feb 1976, two from that date). The majority is the difference between the former and the latter.

The Conservatives began with 276 MPs; the figure of 277 given above includes the Speaker Selwyn Lloyd.

In the Majority column, figures in brackets denote the majority the Lib-Lab pact had during its time of operation.

1974 10
October 1974 United Kingdom general election
Lists of UK MPs 1974–1979
UK MPs
Lists of UK MPs October 1974–1979